Battle of Iconium may refer to:
Siege of Iconium (1069), part of the Byzantine–Seljuq wars
Battle of Iconium (1190), part of the Third Crusade